The Dentists Act 1984 (c. 24) is an Act of the Parliament of the United Kingdom regulating dentistry. In particular the function of the General Dental Council, dental bodies corporate etc.

External links

United Kingdom Acts of Parliament 1984
Dentistry in the United Kingdom
Medical regulation in the United Kingdom